Vitali Borisovich Yakovlev (born 13 June 1985) is a Russian professional football player. He plays for FC Kvant Obninsk.

Club career
He made his Russian Football National League debut for FC Baltika Kaliningrad on 19 September 2009 in a game against FC Luch-Energiya Vladivostok.

External links
 

1985 births
People from Obninsk
Living people
Russian footballers
Russia under-21 international footballers
Association football goalkeepers
FC Baltika Kaliningrad players
FC Novokuznetsk players
FC Zenit-2 Saint Petersburg players
Sportspeople from Kaluga Oblast